Where Are the Girls?: Th' Definitive Collection is a 2001 greatest hits album by New Zealand band Th' Dudes. It was compiled by the band themselves and co-ordinated by Simon Grigg.

Track listing

Credits
 Artwork – Andrew B. White
 Compilation Producer – Simon Grigg
 Compiled By, Coordinator [Compilation Coordinator] – Simon Grigg
 Compiled By, Liner Notes – Dave Dobbyn, Ian Morris
 Compiled By, Liner Notes, Coordinator [Compilation Coordinator] – Peter Urlich
 Liner Notes – Bruce Hambling, Bruce Sergent, Lez White
 Mastered By – Rick Huntington
 Written-By – Dobbyn* (tracks: 1 to 14, 16 to 19), Morris* (tracks: 1 to 14, 16 to 19)

Chart positions

References

2001 greatest hits albums
Th' Dudes compilation albums
FMR Records compilation albums